Davia is a surname. Notable people with the surname include:

Anna Davia (1743–1810), Italian opera singer
Gianantonio Davia (1660–1740), Italian Roman Catholic cardinal
Laura Bentivolgio Davia (1689–1761), Italian aristocrat

See also
Davia Nelson,  National Public Radio radio producer
Davia Temin, writer, speaker, and management consultant based in New York